Mikhail Tugan-Baranovsky (romanized: Mykhailo Ivanovych Tuhan-Baranovskyi) was a Ukrainian economist, politician, statesman. He is remembered as one of the founders of the National Academy of Sciences of Ukraine and one of the earliest Ukrainian ministers of finances in the Vynnychenko's General Secretariat of the Central Council of Ukraine. In professional circles he is remembered as a leading exponent of Legal Marxism in the Tsarist Russian Empire and was the author of numerous works dealing with the theory of value, the distribution of a social revenue, history of managerial development, and fundamentals of cooperative managerial activities.

Early life
Mikhail Ivanovich Tugan-Baranovsky was born on 8 January 1865 in the village of Solyonoe in the Kupyansky Uyezd of the Kharkov Governorate of the Russian Empire (present-day Ukraine). His father's distant ancestors were Lipka Tatars who had come to Lithuania in the 14th century; the full family name was Tugan Mirza Baranovsky. 

Tugan-Baranovsky attended high school in the cities of Kyiv and Kharkiv, developing an early affinity for philosophy, including the works of Immanuel Kant. In 1884, he entered Kharkiv University, beginning his studies in the natural sciences. He was awarded the degree of Candidate of Sciences in 1888, but he became interested in political economy and wound up completing his studies as an external student with a degree from the school's Faculty of Law and Economics in 1890. While in college Tugan-Baranovsky became active in the revolutionary movement which sought to overthrow Tsarism in Russia, briefly making the acquaintance of Vladimir Lenin's older brother, Aleksandr Ulyanov, who was executed in 1887 for his part in the attempted assassination of Tsar Alexander III.

In November 1886 Tugan-Baranovsky was arrested for participating in a student demonstration in St. Petersburg marking the 25th anniversary of the death of critical writer Nikolay Dobrolyubov. As a result of the arrest Tugan-Baranovsky was expelled from the capital city, falling out of contact with the ill-fated older Ulyanov. Tugan-Baranovsky married the daughter of the director of the St. Petersburg Conservatory, Lydia Davydova, in 1889.

Academic career

Shortly after his marriage, Tugan-Baranovsky began what would be a long running and esteemed academic career. His first scholarly article, "The Doctrine of the Marginal Utility of Economic Goods", saw print in October 1890 in the journal Iuridicheskii Vestnik (Jurisprudence Courier). In this work, which presaged his later criticism of Marxism, Tugan-Baranovsky argued that the labor theory of value and contemporary Marginalist economics were in basic agreement rather than in antagonistic opposition.

After this first foray into theoretical economics, Tugan-Baranovsky turned his hand to the writing of biography, contributing short popular sketches of Pierre-Joseph Proudhon and John Stuart Mill to a series entitled "Lives of Remarkable Men", produced by the publisher Pavlenkov. In these roughly 80-page books Tugan-Baranovsky was highly critical of Proudhon for his lack of internal consistency, stylistic obscurity, lack of imagination, and hypocritical support of the regime of Louis Napoleon. He was much more sympathetic to Mill, hailing the  economist as one who "more than anyone else helped the spread throughout the civilized world of a right understanding of the spirit of contemporary science, based on the study of nature."

Following the intellectual example of Karl Marx and Frederick Engels, Tugan-Baranovsky looked to England for the path that developing nations such as Russia inevitably must travel. He next journeyed to London in the spring and summer of 1891 to work in the British Museum, there examining the collection of rare books and statistical works. He then returned to Russia, spending two more years at work in St. Petersburg on a substantial tome of business cycle theory, Industrial Crises in Contemporary England: Their Causes and Influences on the Life of the People. Publication of the book in 1894 earned Tugan-Baranovsky a Master's degree in Political Economics from Moscow University.

The achievement of this academic rank allowed Tugan-Baranovsky to gain employment in academia, accepting an appointment as a Privatdozent (lecturer) at St. Petersburg University. According to his student and biographer Nikolai Kondratiev, Tugan-Baranovsky retained this position until 1899, when he was dismissed for political unreliability.

In 1917 Tugan published a book "Paper Currency and Metal", where he presented a theory of fiat paper currency, believing that a new stage in monetary history after the war was coming. He connected the value of fiat currency with the business cycle and with aggregate demand. He proposed active monetary policy, mainly through exchange rate control. In many respects he could be considered as a forerunner of the theory of endogenous money.

Political activities

In 1895, Tugan-Baranovsky and his co-thinker Peter Struve joined the Free Economical Association, of which he became the chairman in 1896. In December of that year he published a seminal article of Marxist theory, frequently reprinted, "The Significance of the Economic Factor in History", which drew the attention and written replies of leading narodnik critics such as Vasily Vorontsov and Nikolay Mikhaylovsky. 
In April 1900, Tugan-Baranovsky participated in the organizational meeting to create the Iskra newspaper, which later became the basis for the creation of the Russian Social Democratic Labor Party. While he consistently expressed Marxist economic and political ideas in this period, there is no indication that Tugan-Baranovsky ever joined the underground Social Democratic movement which was then emerging in Russia.

It was also during this time that his magnum opus, The Russian Factory in Past and Present appeared.  The publication of this book led in 1898 to Tugan-Baranovsky receiving a doctorate degree from Moscow University.

From 1901 to 1905, Tugan-Baranovsky participated in the public life of the Poltava region where he joined the local zemstvo (a form of local government). Later he returned to St. Petersburg, lecturing as private docent and as professor in the economics departments of various local polytechnic and commercial institutes and also at the private university of Shaniavsky in Moscow.

After February Revolution 1917 in Russian Empire he went back in Ukraine where he became a Finance minister in the government of Central Council of Ukraine (August – November 1917). Then he founded Ukrainian National University, Institute of Economic condition, and Demographic Institute in Kyiv. The member of National Academy of Sciences of Ukraine (1918), a head of social-economic department (1919).

Interest in Neokantianism

During the early years of the 20th century he completely moved away from the popular views of legal Marxism towards the neokantianism that is reflected in his various works regarding the cooperative movement. In 1901–1902, Tugan-Baranovsky published his "Notes from the History of Political Economics" in the journal Narodnoe Bagatstvo (National Wealth), where he described the history of economics doctrines in the Russian Empire, and "Notes of the Newest History in Political Economics" (1903). This work was translated into German in 1915. Later he published various other works in Russian and German as well.

In 1919 his first publication in Ukrainian appeared, Cooperation, its nature and goals. Other works continued to appear up until 1923. Since 1906 he was the chief editor of Vestnik Kooperatsii (Cooperative Digest). Before World War I he worked, along with Mykhailo Hrushevskyi and other Ukrainian academicians, on the encyclopedia Ukrainsky narod v ego proshlom i nastoyaschem (The Ukrainian nation in its past and present). As the member of the Ukrainian Party of Socialist-Federalists quit the General Secretariat on 20 November 1917 in the protest to the proclamation of the Third Universal of the Central Rada that advocated a wider autonomy to Ukraine.

Mikhail Tugan-Baranovsky was one of the founders of the National Academy of Science of Ukraine, as well as the Secretary of Finance of the Ukrainian People's Republic.

Death
In January 1919, while en route via train to attend the Paris Peace Conference, Tugan-Baranovsky suffered a fatal heart attack.

Publications

Footnotes

Further reading
 Ablitsov, Vitalii, Galaktika 'Ukraina': Ukrains'ka diaspora: vidatni postati. Kyiv: KIT, 2007.
 Barnett, Vincent, "Tugan-Baranovsky as a Pioneer of Trade Cycle Analysis," Journal of the History of Economic Thought, vol. 23 no. 4 (Dec. 2001), pp. 443–466.
 Bernstein E. Tugan-Baranowsky als Sozialist. Archiv für Sozialwissenschaft und Sozialpolitik, vol. XXVIII (T.-B. as Socialist. Archive for Social Science and Social Politics) 1909;
 Bukharin, N. Theoretical conciliation. Political Economy Rant. Theory of value and profit of Austrian School. pp. 176–185. 1919. At www.esperanto.mv.ru/Marksismo/index.html 
 Diel К. Dr. Michael Tugan-Baranowskys theoretische Grundlagen des Marxismus. Jahrbücher fur Nationalökonomie und Statistik, vol. XXXI (Dr. T.-B., theoretical fundamentalist of Marxism. Yearbook for the National Economy and Statistics). Jena 1906;
 Дмитриев В. Новый русский трактат по теории политической экономии. Русская Мысль, book XI. 1909;
 Голдман М. Туган-Барановщина: к критике буржуазной политической экономии. П. 1926;
 Gerschenkron A. Die Genossenschaftstheorie Tugan-Baranowskis. Vierteljahrschrift für Genossenschaften, parts 3–4. 1929–30;
 Gotz W. Zum ökonomischen System Tugan-Baranowsky. Riga 1930;
 Качор А. М. І. Туган-Барановський. Winnipeg 1969;
 Kondratiev, N. Mikhail Tugan-Baranovskii. Petrograd: 1923.
 Kowal L. M. I. Tuhan-Baranowsky, His Political Teaching, Scientific and Cooperative Activity in Ukraine, 1917–1919. НЗ УТГІ. Munich 1968–69;
 Kowal L. The Market and Business Cycle Theories of M. I. Tugan-Baranovsky. Revista Internazionale di Scienze Economiche e Commercial!, vol. 20, part 4. Padova 1973.
 Курский Л. Теория рынка и промышленных кризисовъ М. И.  Туган-Барановскаго. М. 1916;
 Luxemburg, R. Dis-proportionality of Mr. Tuhan-Baranovsky. Accumulation of Capital (Chapter 23), vol. I. Translated by Dvolaitsky, Sh. State Social-Economical Publishing, Moscow. 1934. Opinion of Rosa Liuxemburg on Tuhan's Theories of Economical crisis in England 
 Michaelides, P., Milios, J. and Vouldis, A. (2007), Emil Lederer and the Schumpeter, Hilferding, Tugan-Baranowsky Nexus, Research Workshop in Political Economy, International Initiative for the Promotion of Political Economy, organized by : University of London and University of Crete, Rethymnon, 14–16 September.
 Michaelides, P., Milios, J. and Vouldis, A. (2007), Schumpeter and Lederer on Economic Growth, Technology and Credit, European Association for Evolutionary Political Economy, Proceedings of the 19th Annual International Conference, Porto, 2007, 1–3 November (CD-ROM).
 Michaelides, P., Milios, J. and Vouldis, A. (2007), Schumpeter, Lederer and Hilferding, on Economic Development, Credit and Business Cycles, 9th International Conference of Greek Historians of Economic Thought, University of Macedonia, 11–12 May.
 Мицюк О. Наукова діяльність політико-економіста М. І. Туган-Барановського. Л. 1931;
 Moisseev M. L'évolution d'une doctrine. La theorie des crises de Tougan-Baranoysky et la conception moderne des crises économiques. Revue d'histoire économique et sociale. vol. XX. Paris 1932;
 Nenovsky, N. Place of Labor and Labor Theory in Tugan Baranovsky's Theoretical System, The Kyoto Economic Review, Vol. 78 (2009), No.1 pp. 53–77.
 Nenovsky, N. Discussion on paper currency among Russian economists during the Great War (1914–1917) with special emphasis on Tugan - Baranovsky’s contributions, Revue d’histoire de la pensée économique, vol. 2 no. 10 pp. 103–140, 2020
 Птуха М. Туган-Барановский как экономист. Кооперативная Зоря, parts 4–5. К. 1919;
 Timoshenko V. M. I. Tugan-Baranovsky and Western European Economic Thought. The Annals of the Ukrainian Academy of Arts and Sciences in the U.S.A. vol. З, part 9. New-York 1954;
 Tschebotareff V. Untersuchungen über die Krisentheorie von Michael von Tugan-Baranowsky. Вюрцбурґ 1936;
 Wytanowicz E. M. I. Tuhan-Baranowski: teoretyk-ekonomista, historyk kapitalizmu, socjolog, twórca teoretycznych podstaw idei spółdzielczej. Roczniki dziejów społecznych і gospodarczych, vol. І. Л. 1931;

1865 births
1919 deaths
People from Kharkiv Oblast
People from Kupyansky Uyezd
Marxian economists
Economists from the Russian Empire
Marxists from the Russian Empire
Scientists from the Russian Empire
National University of Kharkiv alumni
People from the Russian Empire of Lipka Tatar descent
Ukrainian Democratic Party (1904) politicians
20th-century Ukrainian politicians
Ukrainian politicians before 1991
Finance ministers of Ukraine
Members of the Central Council of Ukraine
Full Members of the National Academy of Sciences of Ukraine